Paragigagnathus is a genus of mites in the Phytoseiidae family.

Species
 Paragigagnathus amantis (Chaudhri, Akbar & Rasool, 1979)
 Paragigagnathus bidentatus (Kuznetsov, 1994)
 Paragigagnathus cataractus (Ueckermann & Loots, 1988)
 Paragigagnathus desertorum (Amitai & Swirski, 1978)
 Paragigagnathus insuetus (Livshitz & Kuznetsov, 1972)
 Paragigagnathus molestus (Kolodochka, 1989)
 Paragigagnathus namibiaensis (Ueckermann & Loots, 1988)
 Paragigagnathus strunkovae (Wainstein, 1973)
 Paragigagnathus tamaricis Amitai & Grinberg, 1971 Paragigagnathus madinahensis Alatawi, Kamran and Basahih 2016

References

Phytoseiidae